Shin Jung-geun (born September 26, 1966) is a South Korean actor. He is most active as a supporting actor in films such as Running Turtle (2009), In Love and War (2011), The Grand Heist (2012), and The Five (2013), as well as the television drama Pinocchio (2014).

Filmography

Film

Television series

Awards and nominations

References

External links 
 
 
 

1966 births
Living people
20th-century South Korean male actors
21st-century South Korean male actors
South Korean male film actors
South Korean male television actors
People from South Jeolla Province